Allium ursinum, known as wild garlic, ramsons, cowleekes, cows's leek, cowleek, buckrams, broad-leaved garlic, wood garlic, bear leek, Eurasian wild garlic or bear's garlic, is a bulbous perennial flowering plant in the amaryllis family Amaryllidaceae. It is native to Europe and Asia, where it grows in moist woodland. It is a wild relative of onion and garlic, all belonging to the same genus, Allium. There are two recognized subspecies: A. ursinum subsp. ursinum and A. ursinum subsp. ucrainicum.

Etymology 
The Latin specific name ursinum translates to 'bear' and refers to the supposed fondness of the brown bear for the bulbs; folk tales describe the bears consuming them after awakening from hibernation.  Another theory is that the "ursinum" may refer to Ursa Major, as A. ursinum was perhaps one of the most northerly distributed Allium species known to the ancient Greeks, though this hypothesis is disputed. Common names for the plant in many languages also make reference to bears.

Cows love to eat them, hence the modern vernacular name of cows's leek. In Devon, dairy farmers have occasionally had the milk of their herds rejected because of the garlic flavour imparted to it by the cows having grazed upon the plant. 

Ramsons is from the Saxon word hramsa, meaning "garlic". There is evidence it has been used in English cuisine since Celtic Britons  over 1,500 years ago.

Early healers among the Celts, Gaels, Teutonic tribes and ancient Romans were familiar with the wild herb and called it herba salutaris, meaning 'healing herb'.

Description

Allium ursinum is a bulbous, perennial herbaceous monocot, that reproduces primarily by seed. The inflorescence is an umbel of six to 20 white flowers, lacking the bulbils produced by some other Allium species such as Allium vineale (crow garlic) and Allium oleraceum (field garlic).

It flowers in the British Isles and Ireland from April to June, starting before deciduous trees leaf in the spring. The flower stem is triangular in cross-section and the leaves are broadly lanceolate, similar to those of the toxic lily of the valley (Convallaria majalis).

Distribution
It is native to temperate regions of Europe, from Ireland east to the Caucasus. It is common in much of the lowlands of the British Isles and Ireland with the exception of the far north of Scotland, Orkney, Shetland, and the Channel Islands. The ursinum subspecies is found in western and central Europe, while the ucrainicum subspecies is found in the east and southeast.

Herbal remedy 

Allium ursinum has been credited with many medicinal qualities and is a popular homeopathic ingredient. It is often used for treating cardiovascular, respiratory, and digestive problems, as well as for the sterilisation of wounds. 

Various minerals are found in much higher amounts in Allium ursinum than in clove garlic. It is sometimes called the “magnesium king” of plants because of the high levels of this mineral found in the leaves.

Habitat 

It grows in deciduous woodlands with moist soils, preferring slightly acidic conditions. In the British Isles and Ireland, colonies are frequently associated with bluebells (Hyacinthoides non-scripta), especially in ancient woodland. It is considered to be an ancient woodland indicator species.

Allium ursinum in cooking 
All parts of the Allium ursinum  plant are edible and have culinary uses, including the flower which can be used to garnish salads.

The leaves of the Allium ursinum  are the most popular part to be used in food. Leaves can be used in raw salads and carry a very subtle garlicky flavour similar to that of garlic chives. When picked the leaves bruise, making them smell even stronger. When cooked the flavour of the leaves becomes softer and sweeter.

The leaf is often chopped and used to replace garlic and other herbs in many recipes. The bulb can be used in a similar way to clove garlic.

Popular dishes using the plant include pesto, soups, pasta, cheese, scones and Devonnaise.

Edibility
The leaves of A. ursinum are edible; they can be used as salad, herb, boiled as a vegetable, in soup, or as an ingredient for a sauce that may be a substitute for pesto in lieu of basil.  Leaves are also often used to make garlic butter. The stems are preserved by salting and eaten as a salad in Russia. A variety of Cornish Yarg cheese has a rind coated in wild garlic leaves. The leaves can be pickled in the same way as Allium ochotense known as mountain garlic in Korea. The bulbs and flowers are also edible. It is used for preparing herbed cheese, a Van speciality in Turkey.

The leaves are also used as fodder. Cows that have fed on ramsons give milk that tastes slightly of garlic, and butter made from this milk used to be very popular in 19th-century Switzerland.

The first evidence of the human use of A. ursinum comes from the Mesolithic settlement of Barkær (Denmark), where an impression of a leaf has been found. In the Swiss Neolithic settlement of Thayngen-Weier (Cortaillod culture),  a high concentration of pollen from A. ursinum was found in the settlement layer, interpreted by some as evidence for the use of A. ursinum as fodder.

Similarity to poisonous plants 
Plants that may be mistaken for A. ursinum include lily of the valley, Colchicum autumnale, Arum maculatum, and Veratrum viride or Veratrum album, all of which are poisonous. In Europe, where ramsons are popularly harvested from the wild, people are regularly poisoned after mistakenly picking lily of the valley or Colchicum autumnale.

Grinding the leaves between the fingers and checking for a garlic-like smell can be helpful, but if the smell remains on the hands, one can mistake a subsequent poisonous plant for bear garlic. When the leaves of A. ursinum and Arum maculatum first sprout, they look similar, but unfolded Arum maculatum leaves have irregular edges and many deep veins, while ramsons leaves are convex with a single main vein. The leaves of lily of the valley are paired, dull green and come from a single reddish-purple stem, while the leaves of A. ursinum emerge individually are initially shiny and are bright green.

Ecology
As its name suggests, A. ursinum is an important food for brown bears. The plant is also a favourite of wild boar.

A. ursinum is the primary larval host plant for a specialised hoverfly, ramsons hoverfly (Portevinia maculata).

The flowers are pollinated by bees.

Gallery

See also
 Allioideae
 Allium tricoccum - North American wild leek (or "ramps", a cognate of "ramsons")
 Allium ampeloprasum - Eurasian broadleaf wild leek
 Allium victorialis
List of Allium species

References

External links 

 Tutin, T.G. 1957. Biological flora of the British Isles: Allium ursinum. Journal of Ecology 45(3) pp.1003-1010.
 Ramsons at Gernot Katzer's Spice Pages
 
 

ursinum
Garlic
Flora of Europe
Herbs
Medicinal plants of Asia
Medicinal plants of Europe
Plants described in 1753
Taxa named by Carl Linnaeus